The Police of the Czech Republic is the national law enforcement agency of the Czech Republic. It was established on 15 July 1991 under the jurisdiction of the Ministry of the Interior. The agency is tasked with protecting citizens, property and public order and as of 2015, there were around 40,500 employees. Czech state police cooperates with municipal police departments, which are present in local municipalities.

History 
The Police of the Czech Republic took over land management after the communist SNB in the Czech Republic with the exception of military police (provosts) who are part of the army. Members were recruited from the former communist SNB (National Security Corps), after passing a vetting "democratic" commission established after the Velvet Revolution in 1989 to eliminate from the police force communist ideologues and agents of the secret police. A similar procedure was also undertaken in the then-Slovak Republic. Some police officers were employed by a small federal police force, whose mandate expired on 31 December 1992.

Jurisdiction and organisation 

The Police of the Czech Republic has general jurisdiction in the investigation of misdemeanors and crimes. Its proceedings are overseen by an independent prosecutor, who can bring charges in criminal matters. It does not have jurisdiction in fields falling within the competence of other specialized bodies, such as the Customs service, military police, judicial guard or the Secret service. PČR is the main investigative body of the Ministry of the Interior. It should not be confused with the municipal police, which may be established by a municipality and which supervises public order and road safety; municipal police also have jurisdiction only over misdemeanours, and in criminal investigations may serve only in a supportive role for the state police.

The Police of the Czech Republic is responsible for search and rescue operations and on this behalf cooperates with Mountain Rescue Service of the Czech Republic that is highly professional rescue agency.

Some crimes (such as terrorism) are being solved in co-operation with intelligence agencies such as BIS or ÚZSI.

On-duty officers are obliged to carry service weapons depending on the nature of their work (administrative vs. field work) or by their superior executive officer ordinance.

Regardless of being assigned to nationwide or regional units all police officers while on or off-duty have the right (and obligation) to act if the crime or serious offense is happening and life, health or property may be in imminent danger. Civilian employees of police are obliged to act only while on-duty. Generally, police officers are not allowed to carry service weapons while off-duty if not approved by regional or unit police chief, which is on condition that their life may be in serious immediate danger. If a police officer still wants to carry a weapon off-duty, he/she has to use their personal handgun like any other armed citizen. Off-duty officers can use their personal weapon when acting as a police officer (which makes him on-duty).

Organisation 

 Police President of the Czech Republic
 Office of the Police President
 First Deputy for External Service (uniformed)
 Protection Service
 Explosive Ordnance Disposal Service
 Aviation Service
 Police Education and Service Training Unit
 Directorate of Alien and Border Police Service
 Directorate of Public Order Police Service
 Directorate of Traffic Police Service
 Directorate of Weapons and Security Material Service
 Deputy for Criminal Police and Investigation Service
 Bureau of Criminal Police and Investigation Service
 National Headquarters Against Organized Crime of the CPIS (NCOZ)
 National Drug Headquarters of the CPIS (NPC)
 Unit for Special Operations of the CPIS (USČ)
 Unit for Intelligence Gathering of the CPIS (UZČ)
 Rapid Response Unit (URNA)
 Office of Documentation and Investigation of Crime of Communism of the CPIS
 Deputy for Economics
 Logistics Support Administration
 Directorate of Administration and Service Support
 Regional Police Directorates
 Capital City Prague
 Central Bohemian Region
 South Bohemian Region
 Plzeň Region
 Karlovy Vary Region
 Ústí nad Labem Region
 Liberec Region
 Hradec Králové Region
 Pardubice Region
 South Moravian Region
 Vysočina Region
 Zlín Region
 Moravian-Silesian Region
 Olomouc Region

Nationwide jurisdiction  

 Institute of Criminalistics Prague
 Aviation Service
 National Headquarters Against Organized Crime of the Criminal Police and Investigation Service - created in August 2016 by joining two nationwide operating units of the Criminal Police and Investigation Service:
 Unit for Organized Crime
 Unit for Corruption and Financial Criminality
 National Drug Headquarters of the Criminal Police and Investigation Service
 Unit for Special Operations of the Criminal Police and Investigation Service - cover IDs, undercover cops, fake money transfers, short-term protection of important crime witnesses (support unit, no investigation)
 Unit for Intelligence Gathering of the Criminal Police and Investigation Service - wiretapping, personal surveillance, etc. (support unit, no investigation)
 Office of Documentation and Investigation of Crime of Communism of the Criminal Police and Investigation Service
 Explosive Ordnance Disposal Service
 Directorate of Alien and Border Police Service
 Unit for Protection of the President of the Czech Republic
 Unit for Protection of constitutional office holders
 Police Education and Service Training Unit
 Rapid Response Unit

Regional jurisdiction 
There are 14 regional headquarters, with jurisdictions covering the regions of the Czech Republic.

Police officers serving under regional HQs are usually organized in the following sections:
 Public Order Police Service (Služba pořádkové policie) - general and largest, most versatile, police officers on general patrolling duty serving at local and district police stations, most usually first responders. Squad cars usually manned by two officers, apart from pistols usually with at least one select-fire gun stored in car's rear seats or trunk.
 Public Order Units - perform specific tasks in the area of protecting people and property, special equipment and training, most often dispatched in large numbers (riot gear for crowd control, assault rifles for active shooter engagement, assisting criminal police, etc.). Squad minivans usually with seven heavily armed policemen.
 Intervention Units - regional SWAT teams (8 teams covering 14 regions). Mainly for assisting criminal police with arresting dangerous offenders who have committed extremely serious crimes or to perform preliminary measures against terrorists, kidnappers or hijackers. They may be even assigned tasks related to the protection of buildings or the transport of dangerous substances, objects or valuables. Apart from cars equipped also with transport helicopters. 
 Rapid Response Units - these units reinforce the public order units on patrolling duty in selected areas of the country. Squad cars usually with two or three policemen armed with submachine guns.
 Waterway Units - assigned duties at waterway stations established at major waterways. They control compliance with navigation rules and the Water Act, maintain public order on waterways and bodies of water, help rescue drowning people and clearing up after floods and other natural disasters. 
 Police Divers - assigned not only to waterway stations but also to intervention and rapid deployment units.
 Railway Units - in train stations of major railway hubs, also operate in trains (catching thieves, looters)
 Cynology Service - training of dogs and dog handlers, about 800 dogs are in active service with the Czech Police (K9 officers themselves are part of the above-mentioned units)
 Hippology Service - training of horses and mounted policemen mainly for patrolling in natural reserve areas and for riot duty (mounted policemen themselves are part of the above-mentioned units)
 Traffic Police Service - supervising the safety and flow of road traffic, dealing with traffic accidents and to check whether traffic rules are followed. 
 Weapons and Security Material Service - deals with civilian firearms ownership and issuing of gun licenses, business with military equipment, explosives, gun ranges etc.
 Explosive Ordnance Disposal Service - apart from disposing of explosive materials also provides expert opinions in the field of forensic pyrotechnics
 Criminal Police and Investigation Service - second largest service, usually divided into:
 White Collar Crime Division (Operative Search, Investigation) - economical, tax, currency related crime
 Usually divided into specialized sections (according of size of department)
 Analytics and Cybercrime Division (analytics for other two divisions, cybercrime)
 General Crime Division (Operative Search, Investigation) - usually divided into specialized sections (according of size of department):
 1st Section - Homicides, violent crimes, suicides
 2nd Section - Robberies, extortions/blackmail
 3rd Section - Sexual and/or juvenile related crime, rape, prostitution
 4th Section - Vehicle thefts
 5th Section - Thefts, property related crime
 6th Section - Search for people and things
 7th Section - Permanent crime scene response unit
 8th Section - Drug related crime
 9th Section - Extremism, racially motivated crime, hooligans
 Forensic Laboratories and Expertise Service (OKTE)
 Operative Documentation Division
 Technical Security Division

Equipment 

As of 2011, the Police of the Czech Republic employs about 41,000 officers, with a ratio of about 45 officers per 10,000 population. Of these, about 3,500 are traffic-police officers.

Transport

Cars and motorcycles

 Typical patrol cars: 
Škoda Octavia  1.8 (118 kW, 132 kW) & 2.0 (140 kW) 
Škoda Kodiaq 2.0 (140 kW)
Škoda Scala 1.5 (110 kW)
Hyundai Tucson 1.6 (130 kW)
Hyundai Ioniq Electric (100 kW, 38.3 kWh battery)
Hyundai Kona Electric (150 kW, 64 kWh battery)
 Typical offroad patrol cars:
Škoda Yeti
Volkswagen Amarok
Ford Ranger
Land Rover Discovery
Toyota Land Cruiser
 Typical traffic police vehicles:
Škoda Superb  2.0 (206 kW) (unmarked & marked)
Volkswagen Passat VR6 3.6 (221 kW) (unmarked)
BMW 540i xDrive Touring (245 kW) (unmarked & marked)
Ferrari F 142–458 Italia (416 kW) (marked, originally confiscated as proceeds of criminal activity)
VW Transporter (marked)
BMW Motorcycles (800 and 1250 ccm) (marked)
 Other: 
 Various unmarked cars for general duty (usually Škoda models).
 Marked and unmarked Audi A6/A8 and BMW 7 for the department of protective service.
 Various unmarked cars seized from criminals (Porsche, etc).
 VW Transporter T6 and T6.1 as minivans, mobile offices
 VW Crafter, Ford Transit, Mercedes-Benz Sprinter as minivans, vans
 Tatra trucks for special purposes
 Iveco buses
 BRDM-2

Helicopters

Watercraft 
2 motorboats Marine 15Y on the Elbe river in Ústí nad Labem Region, since 2006. Since 2016, a new cabin boat was delivered.

At Slapy Reservoir in the Vltava river, the 15 years old police boat was replace in 2015 with 2 new boats. In 2015, 16 new police boats (6× cabin boats Tinnsilver 870-Cabin and 10× low-draft boats Alunautic LC 7,50) were delivered, 5 of them to Central Bohemian Region (3 cabin boats and 2 low-draft boats). Other of the police boats were delivered to Orlík Reservoir on the Vltava, to Elbe in Nymburk, and other to South Bohemian Region, Hradec Králové Region and Pardubice Region. River departments of police are in Slapy Reservoir and Prague on the Vltava and in Ústí nad Labem and Nymburk on the Elbe, other boats are used by local police departments on Lipno Reservoir, Orlík Reservoir, Nové Mlýny Reservoir and others.

The Prague river department of the police had in 2004 two cabin boats MB 075 produced in GDR, and planned to replace their Russian ZiL engines with Volvo Penta engines. Other watercraft was 5-meter ship Mayer with a Volvo Penta engine, 6-meter SeeStar Patrol boat with Volvo Penta engine, 4-meter Ryds 500 GTS boat, two rubber boats: 5-meter Bombard with Mercury 25 engine and 4-meter Quick Silver with Johnson 10 engine. In Prague, also the Municipal Police has their watercraft.

Firearms
The following firearms are used by the Police of the Czech Republic:

Handguns
CZ-75 
CZ 75D PCR Compact (most common)
CZ SP-01
CZ P-01
CZ 2075 RAMI
CZ P-07 Duty
CZ 97B
Glock 17
Glock 26
Colt Python (in reserve)

Shotguns
Benelli M3 (Super 90)
Fabarm SDASS Tactical

Submachine guns
Heckler & Koch MP5 (most common)
Heckler & Koch MP7A1
CZ Scorpion Evo 3 (limited use)
Škorpion vz. 61 (in reserve)

Carbines
Heckler & Koch G36 (most common)
Heckler & Koch 416
Sa vz. 58 (in reserve)

Sniper rifles
CZ 700 (phased out)
CZ 750
Heckler Koch HK 417 (.308 Win)
Accuracy International Arctic Warfare
Accuracy International AW50 (.50 BMG)
SAKO TRG 22
SAKO TRG 42
Sig Sauer SSG 3000

Grenade launchers
Heckler & Koch HK69A1

Other
Pepperball airguns
Flare gun vz. 44/67

See also
 Band of the Castle Guards and the Police of the Czech Republic
 Law enforcement in the Czech Republic
 Public Security (Czechoslovakia)

References

Law enforcement agencies in the Czech Republic
1991 establishments in Czechoslovakia
Czech Republic
Government agencies established in 1991